Moscow Oblast, one of the Federal subjects of Russia and was competing under the name of Moscow, made their debut at Turkvision Song Contest when they competed at the Turkvision Song Contest 2014, held in Kazan, Tatarstan.  It is unknown which of the Russian broadcasters who organised the participation of Moscow. Moscow returned to the Turkvision Song Contest 2020.

History

2014
Russia were one of the original twenty-four participating countries and regions that were competing at the first Turkvision Song Contest in 2013, but later withdrew from the contest.  On 20 July 2014 it was confirmed that Russia would make their official début at the 2014 Song Contest to be held in Kazan, Tatarstan instead.  Further confirmation was revealed on 16 November 2014, that the federal subject of Russia, Moscow Oblast, would be the Russian region taking part in Kazan.  During the contest the region would go solely under the common-name of "Moscow". Moscow were represented by Kazan World who finished 2nd in the selection process for Tatarstan in 2014.

Moscow performed 12th in the semi final and finished in 5th place with 190 points meaning they qualified for the final. In the final Moscow performed 14th out of the 15 finalists and finished 12th with 170 points.

Participation overview

See also
 Russia in the Turkvision Song Contest

References 

Russian music
Countries in the Turkvision Song Contest